Sabine Snijers (born 26 April 1970) is a former Belgian racing cyclist. She finished in second place in the Belgian National Road Race Championships in 1989 and 1992.

References

External links
 

1970 births
Living people
Belgian female cyclists
People from Hoogstraten
Cyclists from Antwerp Province